Strong Key is a naming convention used in computer programming. There can be more than one component (e.g.: DLL) with the same naming, but with different versions. This can lead to many conflicts.

A Strong Key (also called SN Key or Strong Name) is used in the Microsoft .NET Framework to uniquely identify a component. This is done partly with Public-key cryptography.

Strong keys or names provide security of reference from one component to another or from a root key to a component. This is not the same as tamper resistance of the file containing any given component.  Strong names also are a countermeasure against dll hell.

This key is produced by another computer program as a pair.

References

External links
CodeProject: Strong Names Explained
MSDN: Strong-Named Assemblies

Programming constructs
.NET terminology